Port Royal can refer to two different contemporary communities in the Canadian province of Nova Scotia:

  Port Royal is a rural farming community in Annapolis County which was the site of a 17th-century French colonization effort known as the Habitation at Port-Royal.
  Port Royal is a rural fishing community in Richmond County on Isle Madame.
 Port-Royal (Acadia) (1632-1710) is present-day Annapolis, Nova Scotia